is a station in Gōtsu, Shimane Prefecture, Japan.

Lines
West Japan Railway Company (JR West)
Sanin Main Line

Surroundings
 San'in Expressway Gōtsu-Nishi I.C.
 Japan National Route 9

Adjacent stations
West Japan Railway Company (JR West)

Railway stations in Japan opened in 1959
Railway stations in Shimane Prefecture
Sanin Main Line